Ashley Madison, or The Ashley Madison Agency, is a Canadian online dating service and social networking service. It was launched in 2001 and marketed primarily to people who are married or in relationships who are looking for affairs. The website's slogan is "Life is short. Have an affair."

The website has been widely condemned for being a "business built on the back of broken hearts", and is also believed to lie about the size of its userbase by "creating fake accounts, or not stopping others from creating fake accounts".

Ashley Madison gained notoriety in 2015 when it was hacked and the personal information of millions of users was released to the public.

History 
Ashley Madison was founded in 2002 by Darren J. Morgenstern. The name comes from two popular female names in North America, "Ashley" and "Madison".

On July 15, 2015, hackers stole all of its customer data—including emails, names, home addresses, sexual fantasies and credit card information—and threatened to post the data online if Ashley Madison and fellow Avid Life Media site Established Men were not permanently closed. By July 22, the first set of customer names was released by hackers, with all of the user data released on August 18, 2015. More data (including some of the CEO's emails) was released on August 20, 2015. The release included data from customers who had previously paid a $19 fee to Ashley Madison to supposedly have their data deleted. The fee was also applied to people who had accounts set up against their will, as a workplace prank, or because of a mistyped email address.

On August 28, 2015, Noel Biderman agreed to step down as chief executive officer of Avid Life Media Inc. A statement released by the firm said his departure was "in the best interest of the company".

In July 2016, parent company Avid Life Media re-branded itself to Ruby Corp. and appointed Rob Segal as its new CEO. In the same month, the company changed its signature tagline from "Life is Short. Have an Affair." to "Find your moment", and updated its brand imagery to replace the image of a woman wearing a wedding ring with a red gem-shaped symbol as its logo.

By 2017, CEO Rob Segal and President James Millership had stepped down from their respective roles.

In May 2017, Ashley Madison unretired the tagline "Life is short. Have an affair", and the image of the married woman, symbolic of the company's returned focus on married dating. In February 2019, the company announced it had reached the 60-million-member mark. In a 2019 interview, Ashley Madison's Chief Strategy Officer Paul Keable stated that the service helps create up to one million affairs every month.

Membership
Ashley Madison is a membership website and service based in Canada; its membership includes more than 60 million people in 53 countries.

The company announced plans to launch in Singapore in 2014. However, Singapore's Media Development Authority (MDA) announced that it will not allow Ashley Madison to operate in Singapore as "it promotes adultery and disregards family values".

Business model
Unlike Match.com or eHarmony, Ashley Madison's business model is based on credits rather than monthly subscriptions. For a conversation between two members, one of the members, always the man, must pay eight credits to initiate the conversation. Any follow-up messages between the two members are free after the communication has been initiated. Ashley Madison also has a real-time chat feature where credits buy a certain time allotment.

The site allows users to hide their account profiles for free. Users looking to delete their accounts, even those made without the individual's consent, are charged a $19 fee. The "full delete" option claims to remove user profiles, all messages sent and received, site usage history, personally identifiable information, and photos. The data disclosures in 2015 revealed that this "permanent deletion" feature did not permanently delete anything, and all data was recoverable.

Criticism
Trish McDermott, a consultant who helped found Match.com, accused Ashley Madison of being a "business built on the back of broken hearts, ruined marriages, and damaged families". Biderman responded by stating that the site is "just a platform" and a website or a commercial will not convince anyone to commit adultery. According to Biderman, affairs help preserve many marriages.

Guarantee
Ashley Madison offered a guarantee that users will "find someone": "we GUARANTEE that you will successfully find what you're looking for or we'll give you your money back." In order to qualify, users had to purchase the most expensive package, send more expensive "priority" messages to 18 unique members each month for three months, send five Ashley Madison gifts per month, and engage in 60 minutes of paid chat per month. Compounding the problem is that "more men than women use the service, with the disparity increasing as they advance in age", and "Men seek sex, while women seek passion." A page on Ashley Madison, entitled "Is Ashley Madison a scam? Is Ashley Madison a fraud?" addressed some of these issues in an attempt to win over prospective customers and teach them best practices for using the site.

Segal and Millership phased out the guarantee feature on July 5, 2016. It no longer appears on the company website, advertising or promotion.

Fake female bot accounts
According to Annalee Newitz, editor-in-chief of Gizmodo, who has analyzed the 2015 leaked data, Ashley Madison had over 70,000 bots sending fake female messages to male users. She had previously released an analysis purporting to show that only a minuscule proportion (12,000 out of 5.5 million) of registered female accounts were used on a regular basis, but she has subsequently disavowed this analysis, saying that from the data released there is no way of determining how many women actually used the service. Newitz noted a clause in the terms of service which states that "many profiles are for 'amusement only'".

In 2012, a former employee claimed in a lawsuit that she was requested to create thousands of fake female accounts attractive to male customers, resulting in repetitive stress injury.  The case was settled out of court.

In July 2016, CEO Rob Segal and newly appointed President James Millership told Reuters that the company had phased out bots by late 2015. Segal shared an independent report by EY (Ernst & Young) which verified the phase-out.

Advertising
Ashley Madison employs guerrilla marketing techniques to advertise its site. One such technique has been the creation of fake criticism websites filled with ads for Ashley Madison and anonymous testimony that the site is legitimate. For example, the site "AshleyMadisonScams.com" was registered to Ashley Madison's owner, Avid Life.

Ashley Madison advertises with TV commercials, billboards, and radio ads by the CEO, Noel Biderman. TV ads  have been pulled from the air in some countries after frequent complaints. Some proposals turned down by the companies approached include €1.5 million and $11 million jersey sponsorship deals with Italian basketball club Virtus Roma, and Australian National Rugby League team the Cronulla Sharks,  respectively, a $10 million offer to rename Phoenix's Sky Harbor Airport and an offer for the naming rights of New Meadowlands Stadium.

A statement denouncing proposed ads was made in 2009 when Ashley Madison attempted to purchase Can$200,000 worth of advertising from the Toronto Transit Commission (TTC) on the Toronto streetcar system. With five of six committee members voting against it, the commissioner stated "When it's a core fundamental value around cheating or lying, we're not going to let those kinds of ads go on."

Also in 2009, NBC refused an ad submitted by Ashley Madison for the network's broadcast of Super Bowl XLIII.

Lawsuits
In 2012, the company was sued by former employee Doriana Silva, who stated that in preparation for the launch of the company's Portuguese-language website, she was assigned to create over a thousand bogus member profiles within a three-week period in order to attract paying customers, and that this caused her to develop repetitive strain injury. The lawsuit claimed that as a result Silva "developed severe pain in her wrists and forearms", and has been unable to work since 2011. The company countersued, alleging fraud. The company claimed that Silva had been photographed jet-skiing, an activity that was unlikely for someone who had suffered serious injury to the hands and forearms. Ashley Madison later alleged further that Silva had kept confidential documents and sought to retrieve them. In 2015, the Ontario Superior Court dismissed the case without costs, a result with which Avi Weisman, vice-president and general counsel for Avid Life Media, said the company was "very pleased".

In August 2015, after its customer records were leaked by hackers, a $576 million class-action lawsuit was filed against the company.

In July 2017, the parent company of Ashley Madison agreed to pay $11.2 million to settle the class action lawsuit filed on behalf of the approximately 37 million users whose personal details were leaked.

Data breach 

On July 15, 2015, the site was hacked by a group known as The Impact Team. Claiming that its security had always been weak, the hackers claimed to have stolen personal information about the site's user base, and threatened to release names, home addresses, search histories and credit card numbers if the site was not immediately shut down. The demand was driven by the site's policy of not deleting users' personal information following their invoiced requests.

The first release, validated by experts, occurred on August 18. Another release was made on August 20, but a 13 GB file – which allegedly contained the emails of Avid Life Media CEO Noel Biderman – was corrupted. This was corrected on August 21, when the Impact Team dumped Biderman's emails in a separate 19 GB file.

Some users reported receiving extortion emails requesting 1.05 in bitcoin (approximately $225 at the time) to prevent the information from being shared with the user's significant other. Clinical psychologists argued that dealing with an affair in a particularly public way increases the hurt for spouses and children. On August 24, the Toronto Police Department spoke of "two unconfirmed reports of suicides" associated with the leak of customer profiles along with extortion attempts, offering a $500,000 reward for information leading to the arrest of the hackers. At least one suicide previously linked to Ashley Madison has since been reported as being due to "stress entirely related to issues at work that had no connection to the data leak".

CEO Rob Segal said in an interview with the Wall Street Journal that the company is making ongoing investments to enhance privacy and security safeguards, including a partnership with Deloitte's cyber security team.  Segal also announced new discreet payment options, including Skrill, Neteller and Paysafe card.

See also
Comparison of online dating services
Timeline of online dating services

References

External links
 

2001 establishments in Canada
Companies based in Toronto
Online dating services of Canada
Sexual fidelity
Internet properties established in 2001
Adult dating websites